Verkhny Nugush (Ürge Nögöş) is a rural locality (a village) in Galiakberovsky Selsoviet, Burzyansky District, Bashkortostan, Russia. The population was 56 as of 2010. There is 1 street.

Geography 
Verkhny Nugush is located 52 km northwest of Starosubkhangulovo (the district's administrative centre) by road. Galiakberovo is the nearest rural locality.

References 

Rural localities in Burzyansky District